Rodrigo Pereira may refer to:

 Rodrigo Possebon (Rodrigo Pereira Possebon, born 1989), Brazilian footballer
 Rodrigo Pereira (Chilean footballer) (born 1982), Chilean footballer
 Rodrigo José Pereira (born 1988), Brazilian footballer